KANG-LD (channel 31) is a low-power television station in San Angelo, Texas, United States, affiliated with the Spanish-language UniMás network. It is owned by Entravision Communications alongside Univision affiliate KEUS-LD (channel 41). Through a channel sharing agreement, the two stations transmit using KEUS-LD's spectrum from an antenna on North Bryant Boulevard in San Angelo.

Subchannel

References

External links

UniMás network affiliates
ANG-LP
Television channels and stations established in 1992
1992 establishments in Texas
Entravision Communications stations
Low-power television stations in the United States